The Chaplain-General of Prisons is the head of the Church of England's chaplaincy to prisons. He is also an ex officio member of the House of Clergy of the General Synod.

Chaplains-general
Smith was the first chaplain-general.
1946-1961 Hugh Smith
1962–1980 (res.): Leslie Lloyd Rees
1981–1985 (res.): Percy Ashford (first Archdeacon to the Prison Service, 1982–1985)
The post of archdeacon to HM Prisons was created in 1982 and consistently held by the CG.
1986–1993 (res.): Keith Pound (also Archdeacon to the Prison Service)
1993–2001 (ret.): David Fleming (also Archdeacon of Prisons)
2001–2011 (ret.): William Noblett (also Archdeacon to HM Prisons)
2014–2018 (ret.):Mike Kavanagh, Head of Chaplaincy, has been Chaplain-General and Archdeacon since 2013, but was licensed on 13 October 2014.
October 2018present James Ridge

References

External links
Norman Doe, The legal framework of the Church of England, p 207

Anglicanism
 
Prison chaplains